Jeff Choate (born July 15, 1970) is an American football coach. He is the co-defensive coordinator and inside linebackers coach at the University of Texas at Austin. Choate served as the head football coach at Montana State University from December 2015 to January 2021

Playing career
Choate graduated from St. Maries High School in 1988, and played college football at the University of Montana Western as linebacker from 1988 until 1991. While pursuing a bachelor's degree in secondary education, he became the Bulldogs' linebackers coach.

Coaching career
On December 4, 2015, Montana State University announced Choate as their head football coach beginning in the 2016 season.

Personal life
Choate and his wife, Janet, have two children; a son, Jory, and a daughter, Jacy.

Head coaching record

College

References

External links
 Texas profile
 Montana State profile

1970 births
Living people
American football linebackers
Boise State Broncos football coaches
Eastern Illinois Panthers football coaches
Florida Gators football coaches
Montana State Bobcats football coaches
Montana Western Bulldogs football coaches
Montana Western Bulldogs football players
Texas Longhorns football coaches
Utah State Aggies football coaches
Washington Huskies football coaches
Washington State Cougars football coaches
High school baseball coaches in the United States
High school football coaches in Idaho
People from St. Maries, Idaho
Sportspeople from Columbus, Ohio
Coaches of American football from Idaho
Players of American football from Idaho
Players of American football from Columbus, Ohio